The International Federation of Automatic Control (IFAC), founded in September 1957 in France, is a multinational federation of 49 national member organizations (NMO), each one representing the engineering and scientific societies concerned with automatic control in its own country.

The aim of the Federation is to promote the science and technology of control in the broadest sense in all systems, whether, for example, engineering, physical, biological, social or economic, in both theory and application. IFAC is also concerned with the impact of control technology on society.

IFAC pursues its purpose by organizing technical meetings, by publications, and by any other means consistent with its constitution and which will enhance the interchange and circulation of information on automatic control activities.
 
International World Congresses are held every three years. Between congresses, IFAC sponsors many symposia, conferences and workshops covering particular aspects of automatic control.

The official journals of IFAC are Automatica, Control Engineering Practice, Annual Reviews in Control, Journal of Process Control, Engineering Applications of Artificial Intelligence, the Journal of Mechatronics, Nonlinear Analysis: Hybrid Systems, and the IFAC Journal of Systems and Control.

Awards
IFAC Fellows

Major Medals
 Giorgio Quazza Medal
 Nathaniel B. Nichols Medal
 Industrial Achievement Award
 Manfred Thoma Medal
High Impact Paper Award
 Automatica Prize Paper Award
 Control Engineering Practice Prize Paper Award
 Journal of Process Control Prize Paper Award
 Engineering Applications of Artificial Intelligence Prize Paper Award
 Mechatronics Journal Prize Paper Award
 Congress Applications Paper Prize
 IFAC Congress Young Author Prize
 Control Engineering Textbook Prize
 Congress Poster Paper Prize
Outstanding Service Award

See also 
 American Automatic Control Council
 Harold Chestnut
 Israel Association for Automatic Control
 Karl Reinisch
 Li Huatian
 John C. Lozier

References

External links
Elsevier publishers

Engineering organizations
Control engineering
Supraorganizations